Jerome Clark (born November 27, 1946) is an American writer, specializing in unidentified flying objects and other paranormal subjects. He has appeared on ABC News Special Report, Unsolved Mysteries, Sightings and the A&E Network discussing UFOs and other oddities. Clark is also a country and folk music songwriter of note.

Biography 

Clark was born and raised in Canby, Minnesota; he attended South Dakota State University and Moorhead State College, (now called Minnesota State University Moorhead). He has served as a writer, reporter, and editor for a number of magazines which cover UFOs and other paranormal subjects. He has been an editor of Fate magazine and International UFO Reporter, and a member of the board of directors for the Center for UFO Studies.

Clark authored the multi-volume The UFO Encyclopedia: The Phenomenon From The Beginning with the first edition being published in 1992. Library Journal stated in its review of The UFO Encyclopedia that "A respected UFO authority provides a much-needed update of the [UFO] field with this new encyclopedia...[it] is the most thorough treatment yet of this puzzling phenomenon...the [encyclopedia] should be considered by larger public and academic libraries. Choice: Current Reviews for Academic Libraries wrote that "the articles are factual and balanced, with neither a believer's nor a skeptic's viewpoint predominating", and that The UFO Encyclopedia is "recommended for public libraries and undergraduate collections. In 1997 an abridged, one-volume edition of The UFO Encyclopedia, entitled The UFO Book: Encyclopedia of the Extraterrestrial, was published as a trade paperback. In 1998, The UFO Book won the Benjamin Franklin Award in the Science/Environment category sponsored by the Independent Book Publishers Association.

In its review of his 1999 book Cryptozoology A to Z, Salon commented that Clark and co-author Loren Coleman "show a touchingly supportive nature" for a subject often criticized for lack of scientific rigor.

Sunday Express combined its review of Clark's 2000 book, Extraordinary Encounters, An Encyclopedia of Extraterrestrials and Otherworldly Beings with another similar book entitled UFOs and Popular Culture by James R. Lewis, calling both books "inexplicably entertaining" and commenting that they "manage throughout to maintain a healthy rationality and openmindedness, neither over-sceptical nor too ready to believe the claims of the UFOmongers."

According to skeptical academic Paul Kurtz, "Clark attacks skeptics for being closed-minded and dogmatic, yet he is easily impressed by questionable evidence."

Songwriting and music reviews 

Clark has written songs which have been recorded or performed by musicians such as Emmylou Harris, Mary Chapin Carpenter, and Tom T. Hall and has collaborated with Robin and Linda Williams. He has also written a number of reviews of American folk music albums and CDs for Rambles magazine.

Works 

 Unexplained: Strange Sightings, Incredible Occurrences, and Puzzling Physical Phenomena, third edition, 2012, Visible Ink Press, 
 Hidden Realms, Lost Civilizations, and Beings from Other Worlds, 2010, Visible Ink Press, 
 The Unidentified & Creatures of the Outer Edge by Jerome Clark and Loren Coleman. Anomalist Books, 2006. 
 Unnatural Phenomena: A Guide to the Bizarre Wonders of North America, 2005, ABC-Clio Books, 
 Strange Skies: Pilot Encounters with UFOs, 2003, Citadel Books, 
 Extraordinary Encounters: an Encyclopedia of Extraterrestrials and Otherworldly Beings, 2000, ABC-CLIO. 
 Cryptozoology A to Z: The Encyclopedia of Loch Monsters, Sasquatch, Chupacabras, and Other Authentic Mysteries of Nature by Loren Coleman and Jerome Clark. Simon and Schuster, 1999. 
 The UFO Encyclopedia: The Phenomenon From The Beginning (2-Volume Set), 1998, Omnigraphics Books, 
 The UFO Book: Encyclopedia of the Extraterrestrial, 1997, Visible Ink Press, 
 Encyclopedia of Strange and Unexplained Physical Phenomena, 1993, Thomson Gale Press, 
 Earths Secret Inhabitants by D Scott Rogo and Jerome Clark. Tempo Books, 1979. 
 The Unidentified: Notes Toward Solving the UFO Mystery by Jerome Clark and Loren Coleman. Warner Paperback Library, 1975. 
 Strange & Unexplained Happenings: When Nature Breaks the Rules of Science by Jerome Clark and Nancy Pear. UXL Publishing.

References

Sources

 Story, Ronald D. "Clark, Jerome", p. 74–76 in The Encyclopedia of UFOs; Ronald Story, editor; 1980, 
 Story, Ronald D. (Ed.), The Encyclopedia of Extraterrestrial Encounters, New American Library, 2001.

External links 

 Book information page for UFO Encyclopedia: The Phenomenon from the Beginning

1946 births
Living people
People from Yellow Medicine County, Minnesota
South Dakota State University alumni
Writers from Minnesota
American fortean writers
American writers on paranormal topics
Cryptozoologists
Ufologists
American UFO writers
20th-century American non-fiction writers
21st-century American non-fiction writers